Roma–Napoli–Roma (English: Rome–Naples–Rome) was a road cycle race held from 1902 until 1961. The race had different names during its history: Corsa del XX Settembre (Race of 20 September) from 1919 to 1927, as it was raced in September, and Gran Premio Ciclomotoristico during its final twelve editions from 1950 to 1961. The post-World War II editions of the event were held in late April or early May.

Italian Fernandino Grammel was the winner of the inaugural edition. Costante Girardengo holds the record with five wins in the 1920s.

Winners

References

External links
Palmarès of Roma–Napoli–Roma on memoire-du-cyclisme.eu

Cycle races in Italy
Recurring sporting events established in 1902
1902 establishments in Italy
Defunct cycling races in Italy
Sport in Naples
Sports competitions in Rome
1961 disestablishments in Italy
Recurring sporting events disestablished in 1961